The Eifelkreis Bitburg-Prüm is a district in Rhineland-Palatinate, Germany. It is bounded by (from the west and clockwise) Luxembourg, Belgium and the districts of Euskirchen, Vulkaneifel, Bernkastel-Wittlich and Trier-Saarburg.

History 
There are three different historical regions: the abbey and the city of Prüm have been directly subordinate to the Holy Roman Emperor in medieval times; later the free city became the principality of Prüm, occupying large portions in the north.

The southwest including the town of Bitburg was a part of the Duchy of Luxemburg from the 10th to the 15th century. Later it was a part of the Seventeen Provinces and hence under Spanish and then Austrian rule. After the Napoleonic Wars the region was handed over to Prussia.

The eastern parts of the district, including the town of Kyllburg, were part of the Prince-bishopric of Trier.

When Prussia gained all these regions about 1815, it established the three districts of Bitburg, Prüm and Trier. In 1970 the districts of Bitburg and Prüm were merged with parts of the former district of Trier in order to form the present district.

Geography 
The district covers the sparsely populated southwestern part of the Eifel Mountains. The portions along the western borders are occupied by a common German-Belgian nature park and a German-Luxembourgian nature park. A great number of rivers rise from the Schneifel in the northwest and from the Kyllwald in the east, and runs southward to the river Sauer (French: Sûre), which is an affluent of the Moselle.

Coat of arms 
The coat of arms displays:
 The red cross symbolising the close city of Trier
 The golden tower from the arms of Bitburg
 The silver lamb from the arms of Prüm
 The blue and white pattern from the arms of Luxembourg

Towns and municipalities 
It consists of 234 municipalities, making it is the district in Germany with the most municipalities.

{|
|-
! colspan=4|Verbandsgemeinden
|-
! colspan=4|1. Arzfeld
|- valign=top
|
 Arzfeld1
 Dackscheid
 Dahnen
 Daleiden
 Dasburg
 Eilscheid
 Eschfeld
 Euscheid
 Großkampenberg
 Hargarten
 Harspelt
||
<li> Herzfeld
<li> Irrhausen
<li> Jucken
<li> Kesfeld
<li> Kickeshausen
<li> Kinzenburg
<li> Krautscheid
<li> Lambertsberg
<li> Lascheid
<li> Lauperath
<li> Leidenborn
||
<li> Lichtenborn
<li> Lierfeld
<li> Lünebach
<li> Lützkampen
<li> Manderscheid
<li> Mauel
<li> Merlscheid
<li> Niederpierscheid
<li> Oberpierscheid
<li> Olmscheid
<li> Pintesfeld
||
<li> Plütscheid
<li> Preischeid
<li> Reiff
<li> Reipeldingen
<li> Roscheid
<li> Sengerich
<li> Sevenig (Our)
<li> Strickscheid
<li> Üttfeld
<li> Waxweiler
|-
! colspan=4|2. Bitburger Land [seat: Bitburg]
|- valign=top
|
 Badem 
 Balesfeld 
 Baustert 
 Bettingen 
 Bickendorf 
 Biersdorf am See 
 Birtlingen 
 Brecht 
 Brimingen 
 Burbach 
 Dahlem 
 Dockendorf 
 Dudeldorf 
 Echtershausen 
 Ehlenz 
 Enzen 
 Eßlingen 
 Etteldorf 
||
 Feilsdorf 
 Fließem 
 Gindorf 
 Gondorf 
 Gransdorf 
 Halsdorf 
 Hamm 
 Heilenbach 
 Hütterscheid 
 Hüttingen an der Kyll 
 Idenheim 
 Idesheim 
 Ingendorf 
 Kyllburg2 
 Kyllburgweiler 
 Ließem 
 Malberg 
 Malbergweich 
||
 Meckel 
 Messerich 
 Metterich 
 Mülbach 
 Nattenheim 
 Neidenbach 
 Neuheilenbach 
 Niederstedem 
 Niederweiler 
 Oberkail 
 Oberstedem 
 Oberweiler 
 Oberweis 
 Olsdorf 
 Orsfeld 
 Pickließem 
 Rittersdorf 
 Röhl 
||
 Sankt Thomas 
 Scharfbillig 
 Schleid 
 Seffern 
 Sefferweich 
 Seinsfeld 
 Steinborn 
 Stockem 
 Sülm 
 Trimport 
 Usch 
 Wettlingen 
 Wiersdorf 
 Wilsecker 
 Wißmannsdorf 
 Wolsfeld 
 Zendscheid 
|-
! colspan=4|3. Südeifel
|- valign=top
|
 Affler 
 Alsdorf 
 Altscheid 
 Ammeldingen an der Our 
 Ammeldingen bei Neuerburg 
 Bauler 
 Berkoth 
 Berscheid 
 Biesdorf 
 Bollendorf 
 Burg 
 Dauwelshausen 
 Echternacherbrück 
 Eisenach 
 Emmelbaum 
 Ernzen 
 Ferschweiler 
||
 Fischbach-Oberraden 
 Geichlingen 
 Gemünd 
 Gentingen 
 Gilzem 
 Heilbach 
 Herbstmühle 
 Holsthum 
 Hommerdingen 
 Hütten 
 Hüttingen bei Lahr 
 Irrel 
 Karlshausen 
 Kaschenbach 
 Keppeshausen 
 Körperich 
 Koxhausen 
||
 Kruchten 
 Lahr 
 Leimbach 
 Menningen 
 Mettendorf 
 Minden 
 Muxerath 
 Nasingen 
 Neuerburg1, 2 
 Niedergeckler 
 Niederraden 
 Niederweis 
 Niehl 
 Nusbaum 
 Obergeckler 
 Peffingen 
 Plascheid 
||
 Prümzurlay 
 Rodershausen 
 Roth an der Our 
 Schankweiler 
 Scheitenkorb 
 Scheuern 
 Sevenig bei Neuerburg 
 Sinspelt 
 Übereisenbach 
 Uppershausen 
 Utscheid 
 Waldhof-Falkenstein 
 Wallendorf
 Weidingen 
 Zweifelscheid 
|-
! colspan=4|4. Prüm
|- valign=top
|
 Auw bei Prüm
 Bleialf
 Brandscheid
 Buchet
 Büdesheim
 Dingdorf
 Feuerscheid
 Fleringen
 Giesdorf
 Gondenbrett
 Großlangenfeld
||
<li> Habscheid
<li> Heckhuscheid
<li> Heisdorf
<li> Hersdorf
<li> Kleinlangenfeld
<li> Lasel
<li> Masthorn
<li> Matzerath
<li> Mützenich
<li> Neuendorf
<li> Niederlauch
||
<li> Nimshuscheid
<li> Nimsreuland
<li> Oberlascheid
<li> Oberlauch
<li> Olzheim
<li> Orlenbach
<li> Pittenbach
<li> Pronsfeld
<li> Prüm1, 2
<li> Rommersheim
<li> Roth bei Prüm
||
<li> Schönecken
<li> Schwirzheim
<li> Seiwerath
<li> Sellerich
<li> Wallersheim
<li> Watzerath
<li> Wawern
<li> Weinsheim
<li> Winringen
<li> Winterscheid
<li> Winterspelt
|-
! colspan=4|5. Speicher
|- valign=top
|
 Auw an der Kyll
 Beilingen
 Herforst
||
<li> Hosten
<li> Orenhofen
<li> Philippsheim
||
<li> Preist
<li> Spangdahlem
<li> Speicher1
||
|-
| colspan="4" style="text-align:center;"|1seat of the Verbandsgemeinde; 2town
|}

References

External links 

  (German)
German-Belgian Nature Park Hohes Venn / Eifel (German, French)
German-Luxembourgian Nature Park Southern Eifel (German, English, French, Dutch)

 
Districts of Rhineland-Palatinate